Sammi (Shahmukhi: سمّی) is a traditional dance form originating from the tribal communities of Punjab. The dance is popular in the Sandalbar and Pothwar regions of Punjab, Pakistan.

Costume

The dancers are dressed in bright colored kurtas and full flowing skirts called Ghagra or Lehenga. A peculiar silver hair ornament is associated with this dance.

Performance

Like Giddha it is danced in a circle. The dancers stand in a ring and swing their hands bringing them up from the sides, right in front. The refrain of the most popular Sammi song is "Sammi Meri waar..".

See also
 Punjabi dance
 Giddha – Punjabi Female dance.
 Bhangra – Punjabi Male dance.

References

Further reading
Schreffler, Gibb. 2012. “Desperately Seeking Sammi: Re-inventing Women’s Dance in Punjab.” Sikh Formations 8(2).

Punjabi culture
Folk dances of Punjab